Jorge Luis Toro Sánchez (born January 10, 1939) is a retired football midfielder from Chile, who represented his native country at the 1962 FIFA World Cup in Chile. He scored the second goal in Chile's 2-0 win over Italy at that tournament, in a match that is remembered as the Battle of Santiago.

Honours

Club
Colo-Colo
 Primera División (1): 1960

Unión Española
 Primera División (1): 1973

International
 FIFA World Cup (1): Third place 1962

External links
 Weltfussball profile
 Jorge Toro at PartidosdeLaRoja 

1939 births
Living people
Footballers from Santiago
Chilean footballers
Association football midfielders
Chile international footballers
1962 FIFA World Cup players
Chilean expatriate footballers
Chilean expatriate sportspeople in Italy
Expatriate footballers in Italy
Chilean Primera División players
Primera B de Chile players
Serie A players
Serie B players
Colo-Colo footballers
Unión Española footballers
Deportes Concepción (Chile) footballers
Audax Italiano footballers
Deportes La Serena footballers
U.C. Sampdoria players
Modena F.C. players
Hellas Verona F.C. players
Chilean football managers
Unión La Calera managers
Deportes Colchagua managers
Santiago Wanderers managers
Deportes Iquique managers
Cobreloa managers
Primera B de Chile managers
Chilean Primera División managers